The following is a list of space opera media. Space opera is a subgenre of science fiction that David G. Hartwell and Kathryn Cramer define as "colorful, dramatic, large-scale science fiction adventure, competently and sometimes beautifully written, usually focused on a sympathetic, heroic central character and plot action, and usually set in the relatively distant future, and in space or on other worlds, characteristically optimistic in tone. It often deals with war, piracy, military virtues, and very large-scale action, large stakes."

The following are works that independent commentators have characterized as space opera, ordered chronologically by date of first publication.

Print
These are works of print media.

Novels and series
 Edison's Conquest of Mars (1898) by Garrett P. Serviss
 Buck Rodger's Armageddon 2419 A.D. (1928) by Philip Francis Nowlan
 The Skylark series (1928–1965)  by E. E. "Doc" Smith
 Arcot, Wade and Morey (1930–32) by John W. Campbell
 The Lensman series (1934-1948) and The Vortex Blaster (1960) by E. E. Smith
 Empire (1945-1951), and Foundation series (1942–1999) by Isaac Asimov
 Federation series (1952-1964) by H. Beam Piper
 Starship Troopers (1959) by Robert A Heinlein
 Known Space (1964-present) by Larry Niven
 Dune (1965-present) by Frank Herbert
 The Dag Fletcher series (1966-1976) by John Rankine
 The Dumarest Saga (1967-2008) by E.C. Tubb
 The Cap Kennedy series (1973-1983) by E.C. Tubb (writing as Gregory Kern)
 Alliance-Union universe series (1976–present) and Foreigner universe (1994–present) series by C. J. Cherryh
 The Hitchhiker's Guide to the Galaxy series (1978-present)
 The Uplift Universe novels (1980–98) by David Brin
 Legend of the Galactic Heroes (1982–1989) by Yoshiki Tanaka
The War Against the Chtorr (1983-present) by David Gerrold
 The Ender's Game series (1985–present) by Orson Scott Card
 Culture series (1987–2012) and The Algebraist (2004) by Iain M. Banks
 Vorkosigan Saga (1987–present) by Lois McMaster Bujold
 Liaden universe series (1988-present) by Sharon Lee and Steve Miller
 Hyperion Cantos series (1989–1996) by Dan Simmons
 The Gap Cycle series (1990–1996) by Stephen R. Donaldson
 Star Wolf (1990-2004) by David Gerrold
 The Xeelee Sequence series (1991–present) by Stephen Baxter
 Honorverse series (1992–present) by David Weber
 The Zones of Thought series (1992–present) by Vernor Vinge
 Mars Trilogy (Red, Green, and Blue Mars) (1993-1999) by Kim Stanley Robinson
 Seafort Saga series (1994-2001) by David Feintuch
 Skolian Saga series p (1995-present) by Catherine Asaro
 Crest of the Stars series (1996–present) by Hiroyuki Morioka
 Revelation Space series (2001–present) by Alastair Reynolds
 The Golden Oecumene series (2001 - 2003) by John C. Wright
 Dread Empire's Fall (2002–2005) by Walter Jon Williams
 Saga of Seven Suns (2002–2008) and The Saga of Shadows (2014–present) by Kevin J. Anderson
 Singularity Sky, Iron Sunrise and Saturn's Children (2003–present) by Charles Stross
 Commonwealth Saga (2004–2005) and The Night's Dawn Trilogy (1996–1999) by Peter F. Hamilton
 The Lost Fleet (2006–present) by Jack Campbell
 Spiral Arm series (2008–2013) by Michael F. Flynn
 Humanities Fire (2009-2016) by Michael Cobley
 The Expanse (2011–present) by James S. A. Corey
 A Confusion of Princes (2012) by Garth Nix
 The Illuminae Files series (2013-2016) and Aurora Cycle series (2019-present) by Amie Kaufman and Jay Kristoff
 Imperial Radch (2013–present) by Ann Leckie
 The Collapsing Empire: The Interdependency series (2017-present) by John Scalzi
 A Memory Called Empire (2019) by Arkady Martine
 Dragon Pearl (2019) by Yoon Ha Lee
 The Sun Chronicles (2019-present) by Kate Elliott

Anthologies and collections
 Space Opera (1974) by Brian Aldiss
 The Space Opera Renaissance (2006) by David G. Hartwell and Kathryn Cramer
 The New Space Opera (2007) by Gardner Dozois and Jonathan Strahan (2007)
 The New Space Opera 2 (2009) by Gardner Dozois and Jonathan Strahan

Short fiction
 Buck Rogers series (1928–present) by Philip Francis Nowlan and others
 Perry Rhodan series (1961–present) in German by K. H. Scheer and Clark Darlton.
 Berserker series (1967–2005) by Fred Saberhagen

Comics and manga
 Buck Rogers (1929-1967)
 Flash Gordon series (1934–present) by Alex Raymond and others
 Dan Dare (1950–2008), created by Frank Hampson
 Perry Rhodan (1961-present), created by K. H. Scheer and Walter Ernsting
Lone Sloane (1966), created by Philippe Druillet
 Valérian and Laureline (1967–present) by Pierre Christin and Jean-Claude Mézières
 Guardians of the Galaxy (1969–present) by Marvel Comics
 Adam Warlock (1975–1977) by Jim Starlin
 Space Adventure Cobra (1978–1984) by Buichi Terasawa
 Dreadstar (1980–1988) by Jim Starlin
 The Incal (1981–present) by Alejandro Jodorowsky
 Nexus (1981–present) by Mike Baron and Steve Rude
 Metabarons (1992–2003) by Alejandro Jodorowsky
 Atari Force (1982–1986) by Gerry Conway, Roy Thomas, Ross Andru, Gil Kane, Dick Giordano, Mike DeCarlo, José Luis García-López , Eduardo Barreto, Keith Giffen, Robert Loren Fleming, and Karl Kesel
 Mobile Suit Gundam (1979–1980) by Yoshiyuki Tomino
 The Cyann Cycle (1993–present) by François Bourgeon
 Saga (2012–present) by Brian K. Vaughan and Fiona Staples
 Samurai 8: The Tale of Hachimaru (2019–2020) by Masashi Kishimoto
 Schlock Mercenary (2000-2020) by Howard Taylor

Film and television

Films
 Flash Gordon (1936–1980; 3 serial films and 1  feature film based on comic strip)
 The War of the Worlds (1953-2005; 2 films)
 Dr. Who (Dalek films) (1965–1966; 2  films)
 Planet of the Apes (1968-present; 9 films)
 Barbarella (1968)
 Space Odyssey (1968-1984; 2 films)
 Silent Running (1972)
 Dark Star (1974)
 Flesh Gordon (1974)
 Star Wars (1977–present; 12 films)
 Starcrash (1978)
 Alien vs Predator (1979-present; 13 films)
 Star Trek (1966–present; 13 films)
 The Black Hole (1979)
 Buck Rogers in the 25th Century (1979)
 Battle Beyond the Stars (1980)
 Dune (1984-present; 2 films)
 The Last Starfighter (1984)
 Starchaser: The Legend of Orin (1985)
 Transformers (1986-present; 7 films based on Toyline)
 Spaceballs (1987)
 Stargate (1994)
 Independence Day (1996-2016; 2 films)
 The Fifth Element (1997)
Starship Troopers (1997-present; 5 films)
 Galaxy Quest (1999)
 Titan A.E. (2000)
 The Chronicles of Riddick (2000–present; 3 films)
 Treasure Planet (2002)
 Serenity (2005)
 The Hitchhiker's Guide to the Galaxy (2005)
 WALL-E (2008)
 Avatar (2009–present; 2 Films)
 John Carter (2012)
 Ender's Game (2013)
 Jupiter Ascending (2015)
 Valerian and the City of a Thousand Planets (2017)
 Cosmoball (2020)

Television
 Space Patrol (March 1950 to February 1955)
 Rocky Jones, Space Ranger  (1954)
 Commando Cody: Sky Marshal of the Universe (1955)
 Flash Gordon (1954–2008)
 Fireball XL5 (1962-1963)
 Space Patrol (1962-1963)
 Doctor Who (1963–present)
 Lost in Space (1965–present)
 Star Trek (1966–present)
 Space Ghost (1966–1967)
 Space: 1999 (1975–1977)
 Blake's 7 (1978–1981)
 Battlestar Galactica (1978–2013)
 Buck Rogers in the 25th Century (1979–1981)
 The Hitchhiker's Guide to the Galaxy (1981)
 The Transformers (1984–1987)
 SilverHawks (1986)
 Frank Herbert's Dune and Frank Herbert's Children of Dune (2000–2003)
 Red Dwarf (1988–present)
 Babylon 5 (1993–1998)
 Lexx (1997–2002)
 Shadow Raiders (1998–1999)
 Crusade (1999)
 Lavender Castle (1999–2000)
 Farscape (1999-2003)
 Futurama (1999–2013)
 Zenon trilogy (1999-2004)
 Andromeda (2000–2005)
 Firefly (2002)
 Halo (since 2001, started from video game)
 Spaceballs: The Animated Series (2008–2009)
 Killjoys (2015–2019)
 Dark Matter (2015–2017)
 The Expanse (2015–present)
 The Orville (2017–present)
 Final Space (2018–2021)
 Another Life (2019–present)
 Vagrant Queen (2020)
 The Mandalorian (2019–present)
 Away (2020)
 Foundation (2021)
 The Book of Boba Fett (2021)

Anime

 Prince Planet (1965) created by Eiken
 Cyborg 009 (1966) created by Toei Animation
 Gatchaman (1972) created by Tatsunoko Production
 Space Battleship Yamato (1974-present) created by Yoshinobu Nishizaki and Leiji Matsumoto
 Space Pirate Captain Harlock (1978-2014), Galaxy Express 999 (1978-2005), Queen Emeraldas (1998-1999), and Queen Millennia (1981-1982) created by Leiji Matsumoto
 Gundam (1979-present) created by Yoshiyuki Tomino and Hajime Yatate
 Dirty Pair (1980-2018) created by Haruka Takachiho
 Toward the Terra (1980–2007) original manga series by Keiko Takemiya
 Macross (1982-present) created by Shoji Kawamori, and its U.S. counterpart Robotech (1985-2013) adapted by Carl Macek
 Space Adventure Cobra (1982–2010) created by Buichi Terasawa
 Armored Trooper VOTOMS (1983–1984) created by Ryosuke Takahashi
 Odin: Photon Sailer Starlight (1985) created by Yoshinobu Nishizaki
 Legend of the Galactic Heroes (1988–present) original novel by Yoshiki Tanaka
 Tenchi Muyo! (1992–2014) created by Masaki Kajishima and Hiroki Hayashi
 The Irresponsible Captain Tylor (1993–present) original light novel by Hitoshi Yoshioka
 Ginga Sengoku Gun'yūden Rai (1994–1995)
 Martian Successor Nadesico (1996–1997) created by Kia Asamiya
 Cowboy Bebop (1998) created by Shinichirō Watanabe
 Outlaw Star and Angel Links (1998–1999) created by Takehiko Itō
 Crest of the Stars, Banner of the Stars, Seikai no Danshō (1999–2005) created by Hiroyuki Morioka
 Vandread (2000–2002) created by Gonzo and Media Factory
 Sonic X (2003–2004) based on Sonic the Hedgehog created by TMS Entertainment
 Starship Operators (2005) produced by J.C.Staff, original Manga series by Ryo Mizuno
 Heroic Age (2007) created by Tow Ubukata
 Time Jam: Valerian & Laureline (2007-2008) based on Valérian and Laureline created by Pierre Christin and Jean-Claude Mézières.
 Tytania (2008–2009) original light novel by Yoshiki Tanaka
 Space Dandy (2014)
 Aldnoah.Zero (2014)
 Knights of Sidonia (2015)
 Neon Genesis Evangelion (1 anime TV series since 1995 and 5 anime films since 1997)

Radio
 Buck Rogers in the 25th Century (1932-1947)
 The Hitchhiker's Guide to the Galaxy (1978-present)
 Space Patrol (4 October 1952 to 19 March 1955)

Podcasts
 Sparks Nevada, Marshall on Mars by Thrilling Adventure Hour
 Mission to Zyxx by Maximum Fun
 Wolf 359 by Kinda Evil Genius Productions

Games

Social
 Outernauts (2012–present) created by Insomniac Games

Tabletop

Boardgames / Wargames
 Stellar Conquest (1974)
 BattleTech (1984–present) FASA Corporation
 Warhammer 40,000 (1987–present) Games Workshop -  Science Fiction version of Warhammer Fantasy Battle
 Renegade Legion (1989–1993) FASA Corporation
 Twilight Imperium (1998–present) Fantasy Flight Games
 Risk: Star Wars: Clone Wars Edition (2005) Hasbro, Winning Moves
 Risk: Star Wars Original Trilogy Edition (2006) Hasbro, Winning Moves
 Race for the Galaxy (2007–present) Rio Grande Games
 Eclipse (2011) Asmodee
 Space Empires: 4X (2011) GMT Games
 Risk: Mass Effect Galaxy at War Edition (2013) Hasbro, Winning Moves

Roleplaying Games
 Traveller (1977-present) Game Designers' Workshop - The classic and quintessential Space Opera roleplaying game.
 Space Opera (1980-present) Fantasy Games Unlimited
 2300 AD (1986) Game Designers' Workshop - Hard Science Fiction version of Twilight: 2000.
 Space: 1889 (1988-2011) Game Designers' Workshop - Steampunk Space Opera.
 Battlelords of the 23rd Century (1990-Present) Optimus Design Studios
 Rifts Phase World (1990-present) Palladium Books
 Fading Suns (1996-) Holistic Design
 Alternity (1998-2000) TSR
 GURPS Transhuman Space (2002) Steve Jackson Games - Transhumanist Space Opera.
 D6 Space Opera / D6 Space (2003/2004–present) West End Games - Generic version of the D6-based system used for Star Wars: The Roleplaying Game (1987-1998) and Shatterzone (?-1997).
 Serenity and Firefly RPGs (2005-2015) Margaret Weis Productions, Ltd
 Eclipse Phase (2009–present) Catalyst Game Labs / Posthuman Studios
 Forbidden Stars (2015) Fantasy Flight Games
 Starfinder Roleplaying Game (2017–present) Paizo Publishing - Science Fiction version of Pathfinder.

Collectable Card Games
 Star Trek Customizable Card Game (1994-2007) Decipher, Inc.
 Star Wars Customizable Card Game (1995-2001) Decipher, Inc.
 WARS Trading Card Game (2004-2005) Decipher, Inc. - Generic version of the SW:CCG.

Video
 Elite (1984–present) created by David Braben and Ian Bell
 Metroid (1986–present) created by Nintendo
 Starflight  (1986-1991) created by Binary Systems and Electronic Arts
 Phantasy Star (1987–present) created by Sega.
 F-Zero (1990) created by Nintendo.
 Star Control (1990-1996) created by Toys for Bob and Legend Entertainment
 Wing Commander (1990–2007) created by Origin Systems, Inc.
 Master of Orion (1993–present) created by Simtex
 Star Fox (series) (1993–present) created by Nintendo
 Marathon Trilogy (1994-1996) created by Bungie
 Mega Man V (1994) created by Capcom
 Star Ocean (1996–present) created by tri-Ace
 StarCraft (1998–present) created by Blizzard Entertainment
 Sid Meier's Alpha Centauri (1999) created by Firaxis Games
 X (game series) (1999–present) created by Egosoft
 Homeworld (1999–2003) created by Relic Entertainment
 Starlancer (2000) and Freelancer (2003) created by Digital Anvil
 Halo (2001–present) created by Bungie and 343 Industries
 Space Rangers 2002 created by Elemental Games
 Ratchet & Clank (2002–present) created by Insomniac Games
 EVE Online (2003–present) created by CCP Games
 Galactic Civilizations (2003–present) created by Stardock
 Space Station 13 (2003)
 Star Wars: Knights of the Old Republic (2003–2014) created by LucasArts and BioWare
 Xenosaga (2003–2006) created by Monolith Soft
 Star Sonata (2004) developed by Adam Miller
 Advent Rising (2005) created by Majesco Entertainment
 Sword of the Stars (2006) created by Kerberos Productions
 Mass Effect (2007–present) created by BioWare
 Super Mario Galaxy (2007) and Super Mario Galaxy 2 (2010) created by Nintendo
 Dead Space (2008–2013) created by EA Redwood Shores and Glen Schofield
 Sins of a Solar Empire (2008–present) created by Stardock
 Infinite Space (2009) created by Nude Maker
 Sonic Colors (2010) created by Sega
 Darkstar: The Interactive Movie (2010) created by Parallax Studio
 Star Citizen (2011–present) created by Cloud Imperium Games
 Endless Space (2012) created by Amplitude Studios
 FTL: Faster Than Light (2012) created by Subset Games
 Destiny (2014–present) created by Bungie
 Xenoblade Chronicles X (2015) created by Monolith Soft
 Starbound (2016) created by Chucklefish
 Stellaris (video game) (2016–present) created by Paradox Interactive
 No Man's Sky (2016–present) created by Hello Games

Music
 01011001 by Ayreon
 Into The Electric Castle by Ayreon
 Space Metal by Arjen Anthony Lucassen
 Star One project by Arjen Anthony Lucassen
 Universal Migrator Part 1: The Dream Sequencer by Ayreon
 Universal Migrator Part 2: Flight of the Migrator by Ayreon
 The Source (Ayreon album) by Ayreon
 Space 1992: Rise of the Chaos Wizards by Gloryhammer
 Legends from Beyond the Galactic Terrorvortex by Gloryhammer
 The Rise and Fall of Ziggy Stardust and the Spiders from Mars by David Bowie
 Songs from the Black Hole by Weezer
 The Vice Quadrant: A Space Opera by Steam Powered Giraffe
 Ziltoid the Omniscient by Devin Townsend 
 The Devin Townsend Project Ziltoid: Dark Matters by Devin Townsend
 Metropolis Saga by Janelle Monáe
 The Mission by Styx
 Splendor & Misery by Clipping

References

Space Opera
Space Opera Media
Space Opera
Space Opera